The Pampean orogeny was an orogeny active in the Cambrian in the western margin of the ancient landmass of Gondwana. The orogen's remains can now be observed in central Argentina, in particular at the Sierras de Córdoba and other parts of the eastern Sierras Pampeanas. It is uncertain if the orogeny involved at some point a continental collision. The Pampean orogen can be considered both part of the larger Terra Australis orogen and of the Brasiliano orogeny. The Pampean orogeny was succeeded by the Famatinian orogeny further west.

Magmatic belts
The Pampean orogen contains a magmatic belt including granodiorites, monzogranites, and volcanic rocks, all of them of calc-alkaline chemistry. The igneous rocks of this belt formed at various times in over the period from 555 to 525 million years ago. From 525 million years ago onward another magmatic belt of peralumineous and mafic rocks developed further amidst gneiss, schist, amphibolites and carbonate rocks. The igneous rocks of this belt formed in the period from 525 to 515 million years ago.

Tectonic interpretation
The Pampean orogeny can be considered part of the larger Terra Australis orogeny or of the Brasiliano orogeny. The Pampean orogeny developed at a similar time as the Paraguai Belt of the Brasiliano Orogeny, but in difference to the Paraguay Belt that ended up in the interior of Gondwana the Pampean Orogen remained at a continental margin. The orogen eventually ceased activity and was succeeded by the Famatinian orogeny further west.

The eastern magmatic belt of the Pampean orogeny is interpreted as the remains of a volcanic arc associated with an east-dipping subduction zone while the western one is thought to represent a younger volcanic arc that developed on what was once the accretionary prism of the orogen.

There have been differing views among geologists on the tectonic and paleogeographic position of the Puncoviscana Basin in relation to the events of the Pampean orogeny. The Pampean orogeny is believed by some geologists to be associated with the accretion of a "Pampia Terrane" to the Río de la Plata Craton, resulting from the closure of a sea that existed in-between. This sea would have been the Puncoviscana Basin. Víctor Ramos proposes instead that the Puncoviscana Basin was a foreland basin located west of a "Pampia block" that collided with Río de la Plata Craton. Contrasting to this view Aceñolaza and Toselli claim instead that the Puncoviscana Basin originated from an aulacogen splitting Arequipa-Antofalla Craton from Río de la Plata and Guaporé Craton. Following this interpretation the aulacogen would have closed during the Pampean orogeny.

Notes

References

Orogenies of South America
Geology of Argentina
Geology of Córdoba Province, Argentina
Cambrian orogenies
Cambrian Argentina
Sierras Pampeanas